John William Handy (born April 29, 1944) is a retired United States Air Force officer. Serving from 1967 to 2005, he reached the rank of general and held a number of high-ranking commands.

Handy was commissioned in 1967, and received his pilot wings in 1968. His early commands included the 21st Air Force at McGuire Air Force Base, New Jersey; the Air Mobility Command's Tanker Airlift Control Center; two airlift wings; and a maintenance squadron. He then served as director of operations and logistics for the United States Transportation Command; director of programs and evaluations; and deputy chief of staff for installations and logistics with the Air Staff in Washington, D.C. His final two postings were as Vice Chief of Staff of the United States Air Force, from 2000 to 2001, and Commander of the United States Transportation Command and Air Mobility Command, from October 2001 until September 2005.

Handy is a command pilot with more than 5,000 flying hours, principally in airlift aircraft. As a C-130 Hercules pilot, he logged more than 300 combat hours in Southeast Asia.

Education
1966 Bachelor of Arts degree in history, Methodist College, Fayetteville, North Carolina
1972 Squadron Officer School
1979 Air Command and Staff College
1979 Master's degree in systems management, University of Southern California
1982 Air War College
1984 National War College, Fort Lesley J. McNair, Washington, D.C.
1993 Program for Senior Executives, John F. Kennedy School of Government, Harvard University

Flight information
Rating: Command pilot
Flight hours: More than 5,000
Aircraft flown: C-130 Hercules, C-141, C-17, C-7A, C-9, C-37 and KC-10

Awards and decorations

2005 Air Force Order of the Sword.

Other achievements
1992 Honorary doctor of humanities, Methodist College

References

1944 births
Living people
People from Raleigh, North Carolina
Methodist University alumni
United States Air Force personnel of the Vietnam War
Recipients of the Air Medal
University of Southern California alumni
Harvard Kennedy School alumni
Recipients of the Legion of Merit
United States Air Force generals
Recipients of the Order of the Sword (United States)
Vice Chiefs of Staff of the United States Air Force
Recipients of the Air Force Distinguished Service Medal
Recipients of the Defense Distinguished Service Medal